Rewire is a multinational fintech company that provides online financial services tailored to the unique needs of millions of migrant foreign workers worldwide. Rewire was founded by CEO Guy Kashtan, CTO Saar Yahalom, VP of R&D Adi Ben Dayan, and Or Benoz.

In June 2020, Rewire won the FinTech category in the Extreme Tech Challenge (XTC) competition, the world's largest startup competition for purpose-driven companies.

History 
Rewire was founded in Israel in 2015 by Guy Kashtan, Saar Yahalom, Adi Ben Dayan, and Or Benoz in response to the growing demand for affordable and accessible financial services of the local foreign worker population. Initially it served the thousands of Filipinos working in Israel as domestic caregivers for the elderly and expanded its services to additional migrant populations such as Indians, Thais, and Chinese to name a few. Initial investors included Israeli-based groups such as OurCrowd, Viola Fintech and Moneta VC. Additional initial investors included BNP Paribas (Opera Tech) and Standard Bank of South Africa.

In 2019 Rewire expanded into European and UK markets by introducing new local payment accounts (IBAN), debit cards, local money transfers, and cross-border bill payments. In 2020, during Covid-19 lockdowns, Rewire managed to triple its customer base, with 40% attributed to organic growth. To achieve its goals the company has established solid partnerships with prominent financial institutions in multiple countries such as UkrSibbank in Ukraine and digital wallet enablers in the Philippines and Nigeria, as well as the Chinese payment processor giant Alipay to enable its Chinese customers to remit money with ease.

In 2021, the company announced that it had completed a series B funding round of $20 million and also a collaboration with Israel's Bank Hapoalim. New investors joined this round of funding such as Renegade Partners, Glilot Capital Partners, and Jerry Yang, former Yahoo! CEO and director at Alibaba, through AME Cloud Ventures. At the same time, the company announced it had secured an EU Electronic Money Institution license (EMI), granted by the Dutch Central Bank, which allows the fintech startup to (I) issue electronic money, (II) provide payment services, and (III) engage in money remittance. Rewire was also granted an expanded Israeli Financial Asset Service Provider.

In February 2022, Rewire announced its partnership with insurance giant AIG and InsurTech company Qover. Later that month, Rewire announced a $25M strategic round of investment in which insurance company Migdal participated. This move was made to make insurance accessible to migrants.

In June 2022, Rewire announced its acquisition of the Israeli prepaid card company Imagen.

The Rewire platform 
The Rewire platform is offered in eight different languages and a localized app. In providing migrants with tailored financial solutions and allowing them to send payments back to their country of origin, features of the platform include a payment account (IBAN), and a debit card payment solution as well as local money transfers, bill payments in the migrant's country of origin, insurances, and more.

Social good 
In 2020, Rewire won the FinTech category in the Extreme Tech Challenge (XTC) competition, which draws inspiration from the UN Sustainable Development Goals (SDG), as it entered under the Reducing Inequalities goal. Rewire follows the idea of a Double Bottom Line in which a company's value is measured by two bottom lines; conventional fiscal performance and positive social impact.

References

External links 

 
 FinTech Rewire promotes financial inclusion for migrants in Europe through insurance with Qover and AIG™

Financial services companies established in 2015
Online remittance providers
Financial technology companies
Companies based in Tel Aviv
Mobile payments
Online payments
Payment systems
Electronic funds transfer
Companies based in Amsterdam
